is a Japanese manga series written and illustrated by Taishi Mori. It was serialized in Shogakukan's seinen manga magazine Monthly Big Comic Spirits from August 2009 to July 2013, with its chapters compiled in four tankōbon volumes.

A 20-episode 3-minute original net animation (ONA) series adaptation was released between August 2012 and January 2013.

Plot summary
Asuka Kyōno is a pretty but extremely clueless high school girl who has a knack for bringing herself into embarrassing, erotic-themed situations without herself noticing.

Characters

Asuka's father

Media

Manga
Kyō no Asuka Show, written and illustrated by Taishi Mori, was serialized in Shogakukan's Monthly Big Comic Spirits from August 27, 2009, to July 27, 2013. Shogakukan compiled its chapters into four tankōbon volumes, released from August 12, 2010 to September 30, 2013.

Volume list

Original net animation
In June 2012, an original net animation (ONA) was announced by Monthly Big Comic Spirits. The ONA is produced by Silver Link and directed by Masashi Kudo. 20 episodes of 3 minutes each were launched from August 3, 2012 to January 5, 2013. It was later broadcast on AT-X and released on two Blu-ray sets on March 26, 2014.

References

External links
 Official anime website 
 

2009 manga
2012 anime ONAs
2012 web series debuts
2013 web series endings
Comedy anime and manga
Seinen manga
Shogakukan manga
Silver Link